Dobravlje is a village in the Vipava Valley in the Municipality of Ajdovščina in the Littoral region of Slovenia.

The local church is dedicated to Saint Peter and belongs to the Parish of Vipavski Križ. It dates to 1641 and contains paintings by the Slovenian Baroque painter Anton Čebej from 1768.

References

External links 

Dobravlje at Geopedia

Populated places in the Municipality of Ajdovščina